Un militare e mezzo (literally One soldier and half) is a 1960 Italian comedy film directed by Steno.

Plot
Carletti, a 50 year old man who has returned from the United States with his family, is forced into the military because he had evaded his draft. In the barracks he finds a marshal who forces him to follow law and to observe the rigorous military discipline. Carletti makes every effort in order to get out of this condition and to return to his pharmaceutical affairs which, according to him, would bring him fortune.

External links

 

1960 films
1960s Italian-language films
1960 comedy-drama films
Italian comedy-drama films
Films set in Rome
Films directed by Stefano Vanzina
Social realism in film
Commedia all'italiana
Lux Film films
1960s Italian films